On the Wings of Love is a 2015 Philippine romantic comedy television series directed by Antoinette Jadaone and Jojo Saguin and starring James Reid and Nadine Lustre in their first primetime television series. The series premiered on ABS-CBN's Primetime Bida evening block and worldwide on The Filipino Channel on August 10, 2015, replacing Bridges of Love.

The romantic comedy centers around two different people — Leah, a simple girl with an American dream; and Clark, a boy living his American life — who are forced to marry in order to legally stay and continue working in the United States.

The show ended on February 26, 2016, and this episode was divided into two parts: a recorded segment and followed by a live viewing party in Ynares Center, Antipolo. It was also simulcasted live on ABS-CBN and worldwide on The Filipino Channel.

A TV special, "On the Wings of Love: Achieved! from Reel to Real" aired on February 28, 2016, that chronicles the production of this show and the blossoming of the relationship of James Reid and Nadine Lustre as a couple. It was hosted by Robi Domingo and Gretchen Ho.

Mega Manila ratings are provided by AGB Nielsen Philippines while the nationwide ratings are provided by Kantar Media Philippines.

Series overview

Episodes

August 2015

September 2015

October 2015

November 2015

December 2015

January 2016

February 2016

TV special

References

Lists of Philippine drama television series episodes